Graham Clark (born 16 March 1993) is an English cricketer who plays for Durham County Cricket Club. Primarily a right-handed batsman, he also bowls right-arm medium.

References

External links
 

1993 births
Living people
English cricketers
Sportspeople from Whitehaven
Cricketers from Cumbria
Durham cricketers